Moon Safari is the debut studio album by French electronic music duo Air, released on 16 January 1998 by Source and Virgin Records. Moon Safari was re-released on 14 April 2008 to mark the album's 10th anniversary, including a bound book, a DVD documentary about the duo, and a bonus CD with live performances and remixes.

Moon Safari was acclaimed by critics. It is credited with setting the stage for the budding downtempo music style. By February 2012, it had sold 386,000 copies in the United States.

Critical reception

Moon Safari was met with general acclaim upon its release. Writing in Mixmag, Alexis Petridis called it a "superbly inventive" album that "creates a soundworld in your living room, a world where everything's more shiny, chic and sophisticated than reality". John Mulvey of NME praised Air's "sensitive but tenacious grasp of melody, a laid-back disposition and a reckless way with a Vocoder that makes them unafraid of sounding like a digital ELO", also noting similarities to Garbage on "Sexy Boy". Entertainment Weeklys Ethan Smith felt that though the album occasionally bears excessive resemblance to Everything but the Girl, "Air leaven it all with a welcome dash of Gallic irony." Pitchfork writer Brent DiCrescenzo remarked that the music would befit "minimalist architecture design, shagging up against a tree in a field of sunflowers, waiting in line for 'Space Mountain,' drinking gin upstairs in a 747 (circa 1974), and '60s Swedish industrial documentaries", adding that though the album is "too cheeky" for everyday listening, it is nonetheless romantic.

Rolling Stones Rob Sheffield was more reserved in his praise, praising the album's stylistic range and the instrumental songs but calling the group "obsessive". (Retrospectively in its album guide, Rolling Stone awarded the album four-and-a-half stars.) Likewise, Spins Jeff Salamon felt that though the album's pathos is "heartening", the music lacks irony.

Accolades
Moon Safari was voted as the best album of the year in The Face and in Select. It featured in top 10 lists for magazines such as Spin, Melody Maker, NME and Mojo. On aggregation site Acclaimed Music's list of the most recommended albums of all time, Moon Safari ranks 151st, the highest rank achieved by Air and by a French album in general. Rolling Stone magazine later ranked the album at number 93 on their list of the best albums of the 1990s, while the magazine's French edition ranked it at number 65 on their "100 Essential French Rock Albums" list. In a retrospective review, John Bush of AllMusic commented that Moon Safari "delivered the emotional power of great dance music even while pushing the barriers of what 'electronica' could or should sound like", and that the album "proved they could also write accessible pop songs like 'Sexy Boy' and 'Kelly Watch the Stars'" while also containing successful experiments with less pop-oriented material. The album was also included in the book 1001 Albums You Must Hear Before You Die. In 2000 it was voted number 68 in Colin Larkin's All Time Top 1000 Albums.

Influence 
Dave Depper of American alternative rock band Death Cab for Cutie recreated the entire Moon Safari for his cover album, released in November 2021.

Track listing

10th anniversary special edition (2008)

DVD
 "Eating Sleeping Waiting & Playing" by Mike Mills.
 Music videos for "Sexy Boy", "Kelly Watch the Stars", "All I Need", and "Le soleil est près de moi" (from the Premiers Symptômes EP).
 Graphics and storyboards.

Personnel
Credits adapted from the liner notes of Moon Safari.

Air
 Nicolas Godin – bass ; tambourine ; Minimoog ; backing vocals ; hand claps ; vocals, syrinx, Moog solo ; Korg MS-20 ; electric guitar ; talk box ; acoustic guitar ; organ, drums, Solina String Ensemble ; vocoder ; Moog bass, Casiotone ; glockenspiel ; Wurlitzer ; drum machine ; Roland String Ensemble ; percussions, Moog Wave, hand rubbing ; harmonica, reverse ride ; Rhodes chorus, shaker ; piano 
 Jean-Benoît Dunckel – Rhodes ; Solina String Ensemble ; organ ; syrinx, Moog solo ; backing vocals ; Korg MS-20 ; hand claps ; piano ; vocals ; Wurlitzer ; Korg MS-20 intro ; vocoder ; glockenspiel ; clavinet ; Minimoog ; Casiotone, hand rubbing ; Rhodes verses ; Mellotron

Additional musicians
 Eric Regert – organ solo 
 Alf – hand claps 
 Caroline L. – hand claps 
 Marlon – drums 
 Beth Hirsch – vocals ; backing vocals 
 P. Woodcock – acoustic guitar ; tuba 
 David Whitaker – string arrangement, conducting 
 Enfants Square Burq – laughs

Technical
 Jean-Benoît Dunckel – production, recording
 Nicolas Godin – production, recording
 Stéphane "Alf" Briat – recording, mixing
 Jérôme Kerner – recording assistance
 Peter Cobbin – string recording 
 Jérôme Blondel – mixing assistance
 Nilesh Patel – mastering

Artwork
 Mike Mills – design
 The Directors Bureau – art production

Charts

Weekly charts

Year-end charts

Certifications and sales

Notes

References

1998 debut albums
Air (French band) albums
Astralwerks albums
Caroline Records albums
Electronica albums by French artists
Virgin Records albums